The 2015 Moroccan protests was a unprecedented wave of popular demonstrations and peaceful protests by students, teachers, and public workers against utility prices and low wages, Violence against women, and economic hardships. In Casablanca, mass demonstrations emerged on 29 October, and quickly gained momentum in other cities.

See also
 2011-2012 Moroccan protests
 Hirak Rif Movement
 2020 Moroccan protest movement

References

Student protests
2015 protests
Protests in Morocco